Lilian Harvey (born Helene Lilian Muriel Pape; 19 January 1906 – 27 July 1968) was an Anglo-German actress and singer, long based in Germany, where she is best known for her role as Christel Weinzinger in Erik Charell's 1931 film Der Kongreß tanzt.

Early life
 
Harvey was born in 1906, in Crouch End, North London. Her mother, Ethel Marion (Laughton), was English, and her father, Walter Bruno Pape, was a German businessman. At the beginning of World War I the family found itself in Magdeburg, and as they were unwilling and unable to return to England, Harvey was sent to live with an aunt at Solothurn in Switzerland. After the war, the Papes lived in Berlin, where Lilian took her high-school diploma (Abitur) in 1923. She began her career by attending the dance and voice school of the Berlin State Opera and assumed her grandmother's maiden name (Harvey) as her professional surname.

Career

After an engagement as a revue dancer in Vienna in 1924, Harvey received her first movie role as the young Jewish girl "Ruth" in the Austrian film The Curse directed by Robert Land. Subsequently, she starred in many silent films. In 1925, she was cast in her first leading role in the film Passion by Richard Eichberg, side by side with Otto Gebühr.

Because of her training as a singer, Harvey was able to pursue a successful acting career during the initial talkie era of the early 1930s. Her first movie with Willy Fritsch was the operetta film Chaste Susanne in 1926. Harvey and Fritsch became the "dream couple" of German movies in the early 1930s with the romantic love story Waltz of Love; she was called the "sweetest girl in the world" by the press, after a song featured in the film. She and Fritsch starred in a total of 11 movies together, among them the criminal comedy Hokuspokus (1930) after a play by Curt Goetz, directed by Gustav Ucicky, which became a box office success. An English version (The Temporary Widow) was filmed simultaneously, starring Lilian Harvey and Laurence Olivier, who thereby made his film debut. She also appeared in the musical film The Three from the Filling Station of the same year, which also became a major success and gave the young actor Heinz Rühmann his break. During this period she became the muse of the composer Charles Koechlin who, in his sixties, wrote numerous pieces in her honour; initially flattered, she soon became disturbed by his apparent obsession with her.

In 1931, Harvey played the leading part in the film Der Kongreß tanzt (The Congress Dances); her song Das gibt's nur einmal written by Werner R. Heymann became a most popular melody. Her subsequent movies were filmed in English and French versions, so Harvey became known outside of Germany. She was invited to Hollywood and made four movies for the Fox Film Corporation, but these were not as successful as her German films. She eventually abandoned George White's Scandals, leading executives to cast Alice Faye in the part, and Faye became an overnight sensation. After leaving Hollywood she appeared in a British film Invitation to the Waltz. In 1935, Lilian Harvey returned to Germany.

Emigration from Germany

As she was still in touch with her Jewish colleagues, Harvey was placed under close observation by the Gestapo. Nevertheless she pushed the career of her protégé, director Paul Martin, performing in his screwball comedy Lucky Kids (1936) and further successful movies for the UFA until 1939, such as Seven Slaps, the biographical film Fanny Elssler (1937) together with Willy Birgel and Capriccio; as well as Frau am Steuer in 1939.

In June 1937 Harvey had helped the choreographer Jens Keith, prosecuted under the homosexual acts Paragraph 175, by posting a bail for him. Released from custody, Keith escaped to Paris; this led to a stern interrogation by the Nazi authorities. He subsequently returned to Berlin and UfA. In spring 1939, Harvey left Germany and her real-estate fortune, which was confiscated; she was to be deprived of her German citizenship in 1943 because she had performed for French troops.

Harvey went to live at her residence in Juan-les-Pins in Vichy France. In France she made two movies in 1940 – Serenade and Miquette (her last), both directed by Jean Boyer. After the occupation of southern France by German forces in November 1942, Harvey emigrated to the USA spending most of the time in Los Angeles working as a volunteer nurse, but also went on tour performing in Noël Coward's Blithe Spirit.

After World War II

After the war, Harvey moved to Paris. In the following years, she travelled as a singer through Scandinavia and Egypt. In 1949, she returned to West Germany giving several concerts. Harvey retired to the resort town of Antibes on the French Riviera, where she operated a souvenir shop and raised edible snails. In 1955/1956 she met Else Wirth on a tour of the GDR, who from then on became her partner and colleague. Harvey received compensation in the form of a pension from the federal government for the assets confiscated during the Nazi era.

Private life
On 7 February 1953 Harvey married the Danish concert manager Hartvig Valeur-Larsen in Copenhagen, Denmark.

Death
Lilian Harvey, who seemed depressed and psychologically very fragile all her life, died in her own hotel in Juan-les-Pins of liver failure on 27 July 1968, aged 62. She was buried at the Robiac Cemetery in Antibes.

Filmography

In popular media
In Quentin Tarantino's 2009 film Inglourious Basterds, Lillian Harvey's duet with Willy Fritsch from the 1936 film Lucky Kids, "Ich wollt' ich wär ein Huhn" ("I wish I were a chicken") can be heard playing on a phonograph in the basement scene "La Louisiane" as well as in the extended scene "Lunch With Goebbels", as Joseph Goebbels (Sylvester Groth) happily sings a portion of the song after deciding to hold a private screening of the film. After the screening, cinema owner, Shosanna Dreyfus (Mélanie Laurent), under the alias "Emmanuelle Mimieux", comments on liking Lilian Harvey in the film – to which an irritated Goebbels angrily insists her name never be mentioned again in his presence. The song as performed by the Comedian Harmonists remains popular in Germany to date.

The music from Der Kongreß tanzt appears in the movie The Wind Rises (2014) from Miyazaki.

References

External links

Lilian Harvey – Bibliography, Photographs, Postcards and Tobacco cards

1906 births
1968 deaths
English emigrants to France
English emigrants to Germany
English people of German descent
Deaths from liver failure
Bisexual actresses
English stage actresses
German silent film actresses
20th-century German actresses
People from Crouch End
20th-century English actresses
20th-century English singers
20th-century English women singers
20th-century LGBT people